An electromagnetic reverberation chamber (also known as a reverb chamber (RVC) or mode-stirred chamber (MSC)) is an environment for electromagnetic compatibility (EMC) testing and other electromagnetic investigations. Electromagnetic reverberation chambers have been introduced first by H.A. Mendes in 1968. A reverberation chamber is screened room with a minimum of absorption of electromagnetic energy. Due to the low absorption very high field strength can be achieved with moderate input power. A reverberation chamber is a cavity resonator with a high Q factor. Thus, the spatial distribution of the electrical and magnetic field strengths is strongly inhomogeneous (standing waves). To reduce this inhomogeneity, one or more tuners (stirrers) are used. A tuner is a construction with large metallic reflectors that can be moved to different orientations in order to achieve different boundary conditions. The Lowest Usable Frequency (LUF) of a reverberation chamber depends on the size of the chamber and the design of the tuner. Small chambers have a higher LUF than large chambers.

The concept of a reverberation chamber is comparable to a microwave oven.

Glossary/notation

Preface
The notation is mainly the same as in the IEC standard 61000-4-21. For statistic quantities like mean and maximal values, a more explicit notation is used in order to emphasize the used domain. Here, spatial domain (subscript ) means that quantities are taken for different chamber positions, and ensemble domain (subscript ) refers to different boundary or excitation conditions (e.g. tuner positions).

General
 : Vector of the electric field.
 : Vector of the magnetic field.
 : The total electrical or magnetical field strength, i.e. the magnitude of the field vector.
 : Field strength (magnitude) of one rectangular component of the electrical or magnetical field vector.
 : Characteristic impedance of the free space
 : Efficiency of the transmitting antenna
 : Efficiency of the receiving antenna
 : Power of the forward and backward running waves.
 : The quality factor.

Statistics
Thist is the expected value in statistics.
 : max to mean ratio in the spatial domain.
 : max to mean ratio in the ensemble domain.

Theory

Cavity resonator

A reverberation chamber is cavity resonator—usually a screened room—that is operated in the overmoded region. To understand what that means we have to investigate cavity resonators briefly.

For rectangular cavities, the resonance frequencies (or eigenfrequencies, or
natural frequencies)  are given by

This results in a stepwise function. In principle, two modes—a transversal electric mode  and a transversal magnetic mode —exist for each eigenfrequency.

The fields at the chamber position  are given by
 for the TM modes
  
  
  
  
  
  
 for the TE modes
  
  
  
  
  

Due to the boundary conditions for the E- and H field, some modes do not exist. The restrictions are:
 For TM modes: m and n can not be zero, p can be zero
 For TE modes: m or n can be zero (but not both can be zero), p can not be zero

The leading term is proportional to the chamber volume and to the third power of the frequency. This term is identical to Weyl's formula.

Based on  the mode density  is given by

Quality factor
The Quality Factor (or Q Factor) is an important quantity for all resonant systems. Generally, the Q factor is defined by

The factor Q of the TE and TM modes can be calculated from the fields. The stored energy  is given by

The loss occurs in the metallic walls.

where  is the skin depth of the wall material.

The losses  are calculated according to

For a rectangular cavity follows
 for TE modes:
  
 
 for TM modes:
 
 

Using the Q values of the individual modes, an averaged Composite Quality Factor  can be derived:

 includes only losses due to the finite conductivity of the chamber walls and is therefore an upper limit. Other losses are dielectric losses e.g. in antenna support structures, losses due to wall coatings, and leakage losses. For the lower frequency range the dominant loss is due to the antenna  used to couple energy to the room (transmitting antenna, Tx) and to monitor the fields in the chamber (receiving antenna, Rx). This antenna loss  is given by

where  is the number of antenna in the chamber.

The quality factor including all losses is the harmonic sum of the factors for all single loss processes:

Resulting from the finite quality factor the eigenmodes are broaden in frequency, i.e. a mode can be excited even if the operating frequency does not exactly match the eigenfrequency. Therefore, more eigenmodes are exited for a given frequency at the same time.

The Q-bandwidth  is a measure of the frequency bandwidth over which the modes in a reverberation chamber are
correlated. The  of a reverberation chamber can be calculated using the following:

Using the formula  the number of modes excited within  results to

Related to the chamber quality factor is the chamber time constant  by

That is the time constant of the free energy relaxation of the chamber's field (exponential decay) if the input  power is switched off.

See also
 Anechoic chamber
 Reverberation room
 Echo chamber
Integrating sphere
GTEM cell

Notes

References
 Crawford, M.L.; Koepke, G.H.: Design, Evaluation, and Use of a Reverberation Chamber for Performing Electromagnetic Susceptibility/Vulnerability Measurements, NBS Technical Note 1092, National Bureau od Standards, Boulder, CO, April, 1986.
 Ladbury, J.M.; Koepke, G.H.: Reverberation chamber relationships: corrections and improvements or three wrongs can (almost) make a right, Electromagnetic Compatibility, 1999 IEEE International Symposium on, Volume 1, 1-6, 2–6 August 1999.

Electromagnetic radiation